Rude Rides Again is an Australian comedy album performed by Rodney Rude and released in 1986. The album was recorded in front of a live audience at the Gold Coast. In 1987 the album was nominated for 2 Aria Awards, Best Comedy Release & Highest Selling Album, losing to Kevin Bloody Wilson Kev's Back (The Return of the Yobbo) & John Farnham Whispering Jack respectively.

Track listing
Funny  – 18:34 (Rodney/Pat/Mick)
 Waiting For Rude
 Rude's Nephew OR Transplants
 Champion Gallop Needs Inserted Implement
Piss Funny  – 18:52 (Rodney/Pat/Mick)
 Interchangeable Body Parts
 The Zoo
 I Hate Cats

1980s comedy albums
1986 live albums
Live comedy albums
EMI Records live albums
Rodney Rude albums